Mionochroma ocreatum is a species of beetle in the family Cerambycidae. It was described by Bates in 1870. It is known from French Guiana, northwestern Brazil, Peru, Ecuador, and Colombia.

References

Cerambycinae
Beetles described in 1870